Bolshiye Berezniki (Pokš Kilejbuje vele) is a rural locality (a selo) and the administrative center of Bolshebereznikovsky District of the Republic of Mordovia, Russia. Population:

References

Notes

Sources

Rural localities in Mordovia
Bolshebereznikovsky District
Karsunsky Uyezd